{{DISPLAYTITLE:C14H21ClN2O2}}
The molecular formula C14H21ClN2O2 (molar mass: 284.78 g/mol, exact mass: 284.1292 u) may refer to:

 Clofexamide (or amichlophene)
 Clovoxamine

Molecular formulas